Taskino is a rural locality (a selo) and the administrative center of Putyatinsky Selsoviet of Mazanovsky District, Amur Oblast, Russia. The population was 290 as of 2018. There are 11 streets.

Geography 
Taskino is located on the left bank of the Selemdzha River, 19 km northeast of Novokiyevsky Uval (the district's administrative centre) by road. Putyatino is the nearest rural locality.

References 

Rural localities in Mazanovsky District